Stonemasonry or stonecraft is the creation of buildings, structures, mason, and sculpture using stone as the primary material.  It is one of the oldest activities and professions in human history. Many of the long-lasting, ancient shelters, temples, monuments, artifacts, fortifications, roads, bridges, and entire cities were built of stone. Famous works of stonemasonry include the Egyptian pyramids, the Taj Mahal, Cusco's Incan Wall, Easter Island's statues, Angkor Wat, Borobudur, Tihuanaco, Tenochtitlan, Persepolis, the Parthenon, Stonehenge, the Great Wall of China, Chartres Cathedral, and the Stari Most.

Definition

Masonry is the craft of shaping rough pieces of rock into accurate geometrical shapes, at times simple, but some of considerable complexity, and then arranging the resulting stones, often together with mortar, to form structures.

Quarrymen split sheets of rock, and extract the resulting blocks of stone from the ground.
Sawyers cut these rough blocks into cuboids, to required size with diamond-tipped saws. The resulting block if ordered for a specific component is known as sawn six sides (SSS).
Banker masons are workshop-based, and specialize in working the stones into the shapes required by a building's design, this set out on templets and a bed mould. They can produce anything from stones with simple chamfers to tracery windows, detailed mouldings and the more classical architectural building masonry. When working a stone from a sawn block, the mason ensures that the stone is bedded in the right way, so the finished work sits in the building in the same orientation as it was formed on the ground. Occasionally though some stones need to be oriented correctly for the application; this includes voussoirs, jambs, copings, and cornices.
The basic tools, methods and skills of the banker mason have existed as a trade for thousands of years.
Carvers cross the line from craft to art, and use their artistic ability to carve stone into foliage, figures, animals or abstract designs.
Fixer masons specialize in the fixing of stones onto buildings, using lifting tackle, and traditional lime mortars and grouts. Sometimes modern cements, mastics, and epoxy resins are used, usually on specialist applications such as stone cladding. Metal fixings, from simple dowels and cramps to specialised single application fixings, are also used.  The precise tolerances necessary make this a highly skilled job.
Memorial masons or monumental masons carve gravestones and inscriptions.

The modern stonemason undergoes comprehensive training, both in the classroom and in the working environment. Hands-on skill is complemented by an intimate knowledge of each stone type, its application, and best uses, and how to work and fix each stone in place. The mason may be skilled and competent to carry out one or all of the various branches of stonemasonry. In some areas, the trend is towards specialization, in other areas towards adaptability.

Types of stone 

Stonemasons use all types of natural stone: igneous, metamorphic and sedimentary; while some also use artificial stone as well.

Igneous stones
Granite is one of the hardest stones, and requires such different techniques to sedimentary stones that it is virtually a separate trade. With great persistence, simple mouldings can and have been carved from granite, for example in many Cornish churches and in the city of Aberdeen. Generally, however, it is used for purposes that require its strength and durability, such as kerbstones, countertops, flooring, and breakwaters.
Igneous stone ranges from very soft rocks such as pumice and scoria to somewhat harder rocks such as tuff to the hardest rocks such as granite and basalt.

Metamorphic
Marble is a fine, easily worked stone, that comes in various colours, but mainly white. It has traditionally been used for carving statues, and for facings of many Byzantine and Italian Renaissance buildings. Prominent Greek sculptors, such as Antenor (6th century BC), Phidias and Critias (5th century BC), Praxiteles (4th century BC) and others used mainly the marble of Paros and Thassos islands, and the whitest and brightest of all (although not the finest), the Pentelikon marble. Their work was preceded by older sculptors from Mesopotamia and Egypt, but the Greeks were unmatched in plasticity and realistic (re)presentation, either of Gods (Apollo, Aphrodite, Hermes, Zeus, etc.), or humans (Pythagoras, Socrates, Plato, Phryne, etc.). The famous Acropolis of Athens is said to be constructed using the Pentelicon marble. The traditional home of the marble industry is the area around Carrara in Italy, from where a bright and fine, whitish marble is extracted in vast quantities.
Slate is a popular choice of stone for memorials and inscriptions, as its fine grain and hardness means it leaves details very sharp. Its tendency to split into thin plates has also made it a popular roofing material.

Sedimentary
Many of the world's most famous buildings have been built of sedimentary stone, from Durham Cathedral to St Peter's in Rome. There are two main types of sedimentary stone used in masonry work, limestones and sandstones. Examples of limestones include Bath and Portland stone. Yorkstone and Sydney sandstone are the most commonly used sandstone.

Types 

Types of stonemasonry are:
Fixer masons This type of masons have specialized into fixing the stones onto the buildings. They might do this with grouts, mortars, and lifting tackle. They might also use things like single application specialized fixings, simple cramps, and dowels as well as stone cladding with things like epoxy resins, mastics, and modern cements.
Memorial masons These are the masons that make headstones and carve the inscriptions on them.
Today's stonemasons undergo training that is quite comprehensive and is done both in the work environment and in the classroom. It isn't enough to have hands-on skill anymore. One must also have knowledge of the types of stones as well as its best uses and how to work it as well as how to fix it in place.
Rubble masonry When roughly dressed stones are laid in a mortar the result is a stone rubble masonry.
Ashlar masonry Stone masonry using dressed (cut) stones is known as ashlar masonry.
Stone veneer Stone veneer is used as a protective and decorative covering for interior or exterior walls and surfaces. The veneer is typically 1 inch (2.54 cm) thick and must weigh less than 15 lb per square foot (73 kg m−2) so that no additional structural supports are required. The structural wall is put up first, and thin, flat stones are mortared onto the face of the wall. Metal tabs in the structural wall are mortared between the stones to tie everything together, to prevent the stonework from separating from the wall.
Slipform stonemasonry Slipform stonemasonry is a method for making stone walls with the aid of formwork to contain the rocks and mortar while keeping the walls straight. Short forms, up to two feet tall, are placed on both sides of the wall to serve as a guide for the stonework. Stones are placed inside the forms with the good faces against the formwork. Concrete is poured behind the rocks. Rebar is added for strength, to make a wall that is approximately half reinforced concrete and half stonework. The wall can be faced with stone on one side or both sides.

Training 

Traditionally medieval stonemasons served a seven-year apprenticeship. A similar system still operates today.

A modern apprenticeship lasts three years. This combines on-site learning through personal experience, the experience of the tradesmen, and college work where apprentices are given an overall experience of the building, hewing and theory work involved in masonry. In some areas, colleges offer courses which teach not only the manual skills but also related fields such as drafting and blueprint reading or construction conservation. Electronic Stonemasonry training resources enhance traditional delivery techniques. Hands-on workshops are a good way to learn about stonemasonry also. Those wishing to become stonemasons should have little problem working at heights, possess reasonable hand-eye coordination, be moderately physically fit, and have basic mathematical ability. Most of these things can be developed while learning.

Tools 

Stonemasons use a wide variety of tools to handle and shape stone blocks (ashlar) and slabs into finished articles. The basic tools for shaping the stone are a mallet, chisels, and a metal straight edge. With these one can make a flat surface – the basis of all stonemasonry.

Chisels come in a variety of sizes and shapes, dependent upon the function for which they are being used and have many different names depending on locality. There are different chisels for different materials and sizes of material being worked, for removing large amounts of material and for putting a fine finish on the stone. A drove chisel is used for smoothing off roughly finished stones.

Mixing mortar is normally done today with mortar mixers which usually use a rotating drum or rotating paddles to mix the mortar.

The masonry trowel is used for the application of the mortar between and around the stones as they are set into place. Filling in the gaps (joints) with mortar is referred to as pointing. Pointing in smaller joints can be accomplished using tuck pointers, pointing trowels, and margin trowels, among other tools.

A mason's hammer has a long thin head and is called a Punch Hammer. It would be used with a chisel or splitter for a variety of purposes

A walling hammer (catchy hammer) can be used in place of a hammer and chisel or pincher to produce rubble or pinnings or snecks.

Stonemasons use a lewis together with a crane or block and tackle to hoist building stones into place.

Today power tools such as compressed-air chisels, abrasive spinners, and angle grinders are much used: these save time and money, but are hazardous and require just as much skill as the hand tools that they augment. But many of the basic tools of stonemasonry have remained virtually the same throughout vast amounts of time, even thousands of years, for instance when comparing chisels that can be bought today with chisels found at the pyramids of Giza the common sizes and shapes are virtually unchanged.

Stonemasonry is one of the earliest trades in civilization's history. During the time of the Neolithic Revolution and domestication of animals, people learned how to use fire to create quicklime, plasters, and mortars. They used these to fashion homes for themselves with mud, straw, or stone, and masonry was born.

The Ancients heavily relied on the stonemason to build the most impressive and long-lasting monuments to their civilizations. The Egyptians built their pyramids, the civilizations of Central America had their step pyramids, the Persians their palaces, the Greeks their temples, and the Romans their public works and wonders (See Roman Architecture). People of the Indus Valley civilization, such as at Dholavira made entire cities characterized by stone architecture. Among the famous ancient stonemasons is Sophroniscus, the father of Socrates, who was a stone-cutter.

Castle building was an entire industry for the medieval stonemasons. When the Western Roman Empire fell, building in dressed stone decreased in much of Western Europe, and there was a resulting increase in timber-based construction. Stonework experienced a resurgence in the 9th and 10th centuries in Europe, and by the 12th-century religious fervour resulted in the construction of thousands of impressive churches and cathedrals in stone across Western Europe.

Medieval stonemasons' skills were in high demand, and members of the guild, gave rise to three classes of stonemasons: apprentices, journeymen, and master masons. Apprentices were indentured to their masters as the price for their training, journeymen were qualified craftsmen who were paid by the day, and master masons were considered freemen who could travel as they wished to work on the projects of the patrons and could operate as self-employed craftsmen and train apprentices. During the Renaissance, the stonemason's guild admitted members who were not stonemasons, and eventually evolved into the Society of Freemasonry; fraternal groups which observe the traditional culture of stonemasons but are not typically involved in modern construction projects.

A medieval stonemason would often carve a personal symbol onto their block to differentiate their work from that of other stonemasons. This also provided a simple ‘quality assurance’ system.

The Renaissance saw stonemasonry return to the prominence and sophistication of the Classical age. The rise of the humanist philosophy gave people the ambition to create marvelous works of art. The centre stage for the Renaissance would prove to be Italy, where Italian city-states such as Florence erected great structures, including the Florence Cathedral, the Fountain of Neptune, and the Laurentian Library, which was planned and built by Michelangelo Buonarroti, a famous sculptor of the Renaissance.

When Europeans settled the Americas, they brought the stonemasonry techniques of their respective homelands with them. Settlers used what materials were available, and in some areas, stone was the material of choice. In the first waves, building mimicked that of Europe, to eventually be replaced by unique architecture later on.

In the 20th century, stonemasonry saw its most radical changes in the way the work is accomplished. Prior to the first half of the century, most heavy work was executed by draft animals or human muscle power. With the arrival of the internal combustion engine, many of these hard aspects of the trade have been made simpler and easier. Cranes and forklifts have made moving and laying heavy stones relatively easy for the stonemasons. Motor powered mortar mixers have saved much in time and energy as well. Compressed-air powered tools have made working of stone less time-intensive. Petrol and electric-powered abrasive saws can cut through stone much faster and with more precision than chiseling alone. Carbide-tipped chisels can stand up to much more abuse than the steel and iron chisels made by blacksmiths of old.

Gallery

See also 

Categories:
Stonemasonry tools

References

External links 

 HistoryExtra interview with Stonemason Andrew Ziminski

The Stone Foundation Org

 
 Stone

de:Steinmetz